North Maharashtra or Uttar Maharashtra is a geographical region in the Maharashtra state of India. It comprises the Nashik, Dhule, Nandurbar, and Jalgaon districts. It borders the state of Gujarat to the northwest, Paschim Maharashtra to the south, Konkan to the west, and Vidarbha and Marathwada regions of Maharashtra to the east.

History 
Chalukya kings ruled the southern part of region during ancient times. The 160 sq. meters fort in Parola is believed that once belong to the father of Queen of Jhansi. On 13 March 1795, Marathas defeated Nizam of Ahmadnagar and Dhule District became part of Maratha Kingdom.

In 1956, Dhule became part of new established Bombay state and in 1960, after formation of Maharashtra, it became a part of Maharashtra.

Geography
In the summer season, the temperature in the region climbs to over 44 °C.

Rivers 
This region has Godavari River at Nashik, Tapi, and Panjhara rivers in Dhule, and Narmada River in Nandurbar District.

Dams 
Jalgaon District has Hatnur Dam on Tapti River. It also has Garbardi Dam near Pal hill station, and Waghur Dam near Jamner. Nashik District has Gangapur and Nandur-Madheshwar dams on the Godavari River.

Crops 
 Jalgaon district:
Jowar, Cotton, Lentils, Chickpeas, and Wheat
 Nashik district:
Rice, Jowar, Groundnuts, Onions, Wheat, Sugarcane, and Grapes
Dhule district:
Cotton, Jowar, Groundnuts, Lentils, Wheat, and Chickpeas
 Nandurbar district:
Rice, Jowar, Groundnuts, Maize, Chickpeas, and other various lentils are some crops that farmers usually grow here.

Economy
The economy of the region relies on agriculture and common variety of crops include cotton, sugarcane, lentils, maze, bananas, peas, and wheat. Jalgaon District is informally called as "Banana Capital of India". The district is the largest producer of bananas in Maharashtra and grows the world's seventh largest banana crop.

Nashik District is also a leader in grapes production; only Niphad and Dindori talukas are ahead of Nashik in grapes growing in this part of North Maharashtra.

Educational facilities 
North Maharashtra University serves the Dhule, Nandurbar, and Jalgaon districts, Its headquarters is located in Jalgaon.

Culture
Marathi poet Bahinabai Chaudhari was born in Bhadli village near Bhusawal in Jalgaon District. Poet Balkavi Thombre and Vishnu Vaman Shirwadkar, writers of many acclaimed poetry works by scholars of Marathi literature, were both from the region. Thombre was born in Jalgaon District and was considered a child prodigy. Shirwadkar also was a prominent novelist, his play Natsamrat is considered as epic work of literature in the Maharashtra state. Although Khandesh in northern Maharashtra is now part of Maharashtra, its culture is similar to that of North Indian culture.

References

Regions of Maharashtra